The World Cup and Asian Cup, are the primary competitive tournaments the Australia men's national soccer team enters. The finals of both tournaments held every four years in alternate even numbered years. Excluding the tournament years in which Australia either did not enter or failed to qualify for the finals, the Australia national team has nominated the following squads of players to compete in the finals:

1974 World Cup

Head coach:  Rale Rasic

2006 World Cup

Head coach:  Guus Hiddink

2007 Asian Cup

Head coach: Graham Arnold

2010 World Cup

Head coach:  Pim Verbeek

2011 Asian Cup

Head coach:  Holger Osieck

2014 World Cup
Head coach: Ange Postecoglou

The final squad was announced on 3 June 2014.

2015 Asian Cup

Head coach: Ange Postecoglou

On 7 December 2014, Postecoglou named a provisional list of 46 players for the tournament. The final squad was announced on 23 December 2014.

2018 World Cup

Head coach:  Bert van Marwijk

Australia's 32-man preliminary squad was announced on 6 May 2018. The squad was reduced to 26 players on 14 May, then extended to 27 players on 28 May. The final squad was announced on 3 June.

2019 Asian Cup

Head coach: Graham Arnold

The final squad was announced on 20 December 2018. On 24 December 2018, James Jeggo was called up instead of the injured Aaron Mooy. On 2 January 2019, Martin Boyle was replaced by Apostolos Giannou due to injury.

2022 World Cup
Coach: Graham Arnold

Australia announced their final squad on 8 November 2022. Martin Boyle withdrew injured and was replaced by Marco Tilio on 20 November.

References

Australia national soccer team lists
Australia at the AFC Asian Cup
Australia at the FIFA World Cup